Antispila purplella is a moth of the family Heliozelidae. It was described by Kuroko in 1961. It is found in Japan (Kyushu).

The wingspan is 6.5–7.5 mm. The forewings are dark bronzy-fuscous with reddish or purplish reflections. The basal area is shining dark leaden-fuscous and the makings are silvery-metallic with somewhat coppery reflections. The hindwings are fuscous with feeble purplish lusters. Adults appear at the beginning of June. There is one generation per year.

The larvae feed on Cornus controversa and Cornus brachypoda. They mine the leaves of their host plant. The mine has the form of a full depth linear-blotch. The linear mine extends along the leaf margin. It is pale greyish fuscous and the width gradually increases. The fourth instar larva creates a blotch mine which expands along or near
the leaf margin. Usually, one mine is found in a single leaf. The frass is blackish and is deposited in a row occupying the whole width of the gallery in the linear part of the mine. In the blotch mine, it is thinly scattered and sometimes deposited along the margin of the mine. Larvae are found from the end of September to the beginning of October. Full-grown larvae cut out a case in which they fall to the ground. Pupation takes place at the end of May of the following year.

References

Moths described in 1961
Heliozelidae
Moths of Japan